Khaled Soussi (born 20 May 1985 in Tunis) is a former Tunisian professional footballer who last played for EGS Gafsa as a defender. He has won 18 caps for the Tunisia national football team.

References

1985 births
Living people
Tunisian footballers
Tunisia international footballers
Tunisian expatriate footballers
Club Africain players
AC Arlésien players
EGS Gafsa players
Ligue 2 players
Expatriate footballers in France
Tunisian expatriate sportspeople in France
2010 Africa Cup of Nations players
2011 African Nations Championship players
Footballers from Tunis
Association football central defenders
Tunisia A' international footballers